Jean de Courbes (1592 – 1641), or Juan de Courbes, was a French engraver who was active in Spain.

Gallery

References

External links

1592 births
1641 deaths
17th-century French engravers
French expatriates in Spain